The 1856 United States presidential election in Connecticut took place on November 4, 1856, as part of the 1856 United States presidential election. Voters chose six representatives, or electors to the Electoral College, who voted for president and vice president.

Connecticut voted for the Republican candidate, John C. Frémont, over the Democratic candidate, James Buchanan, and the Know Nothing candidate, Millard Fillmore. Frémont won the state by a margin of 9.61%.

Results

See also
 United States presidential elections in Connecticut

References

Connecticut
1856
1856 Connecticut elections